Kutch was a princely state that included Bhuj, Anjar, Lakhpath, and Mandvi. The Kutchi Memons are now spread all over the globe with concentrated populations in Mumbai, Pune, Mysore, Bangalore, Chennai,Cannanore, Tellicherry, Calicut, Kochi, Coonoor, Trivandrum, Quilon, Kayamkulam, Alleppey and Ooty, Aurangabad, Maharashtra
 
Kutchi Memons have the surname Sait (for men) and Bai (for women), although there are Saits among Punjabis too. Bai is a common appellation in northern India for women in high positions, e.g., Rani Lakshmi Bai.
The first families that migrated to Travancore (now central and south Kerala) were called Sett, a vulgarisation of the appellation Seth or Saith - rich man - by the Tamil-oriented Travancoreans. The title got further skewed phonetically, by the Turkish oriented Pathans then in administration to Sait (there are also Saits in Turkey). Sait then became a surname for them and their children. They spread from Travancore to other states, though a few families joined them directly from Kutchch afterwards. After independence many families migrated from Kutch to Pakistan, but migration from South India was very insignificant, and whoever migrated retained the title Sait and are understood to be migrants via South.

Kutchi Memons have mostly been in business, ranging from large trading houses down to road side hawkers, but with the new generation this trend is changing. The community has a very modern outlook and most individuals are educated. The community is very peculiar about its unique identity and in some pockets marriage outside the community is still looked upon unkindly, though in Kerala nearly 95% of Memons can no longer claim pure blood - at least three generations have crossed with native Muslims. The written Language had been Gujarati for long, migrants into Tamil Nadu, Karnataka and Andhra speak Urdu but it is slowly changing from Urdu to regional languages; change to Malayalam in Kerala is practically complete though Kutchi is still understood by a sizeable population. The local languages are used for written communication even among members of the clan in Kerala and Urdu in other states.
 
The size of the population cannot be determined due to its lack of concentration but estimations would put their number close to 0.5 million people. The community follows all the basic Sunni Hanafi Islamic tradition but with somewhat different practices remnant of the old Kutchi traditions modified by local customs.

References

See also
 Memon people

Ethnic groups in India
Ethnic groups in Pakistan

Social groups of India
Social groups of Pakistan
Surnames